Muneshwar Patandin (born 24 January 1989) is a Surinamese cricketer. He played in the 2015 ICC World Cricket League Division Six tournament, which Suriname won, with Patandin finishing as the leading wicket-taker. Suriname were promoted to 2016 ICC World Cricket League Division Five, but later withdrew due to an ICC investigation about the eligibility of some of the players, with Patandin being named as one of them.

References

External links
 

1989 births
Living people
Surinamese cricketers
Sportspeople from Georgetown, Guyana
Guyanese emigrants to Suriname